Protein K  may refer to:

 Protein K (porin), a porin expressed in pathogenic strains of E. coli
 Protein K (gene expression), a DNA- and RNA-binding protein expressed in the nucleus of eukaryotes